Kalyan Nagar is a neighbourhood in the north-eastern part of Bangalore, Karnataka. It is located near Banaswadi and Horamavu. Hennur Road passes through Kalyan Nagar.

References

Neighbourhoods in Bangalore